Daniel Bergey (19 April 1881 – 31 December 1950) was a French Catholic priest and politician. He was the president of the Popular Republican Union of Gironde between 1925 and 1932.

Biography 
Daniel Vivien Michel Bergey was born on 19 April 1881 in the village of Saint-trélody-près-lesparre (now Lesparre-Médoc), Gironde, in a poor family of small farmers. He was ordained a priest in 1904, and was from 1906 de facto vicar of Saint-Émilion after his uncle—who had occupied the position until then—became paralyzed. In 1924, he founded the League of Priests Veterans (PAC; Ligue des Prêtres Anciens Combattants). Bergey was a member of Parliament for the department of Gironde between 1924 and 1932.

He died on 31 December 1950 in Saint-Émilion at 69.

Bibliography 

 H. Hilaire Darrigrand, L'abbé Bergey, héros des champs de bataille, tribun populaire, législateur clairvoyant, Éditions du Vieux Colombier, 1956
 B. Bordachar, Un Grand orateur, l'abbé Bergey : Député de la Gironde, 1881-1950, Grasset, 1963

References 

1881 births
1950 deaths
Members of the 14th Chamber of Deputies of the French Third Republic
Members of the 13th Chamber of Deputies of the French Third Republic